Caloramphus is a genus of Asian barbets (family Megalaimidae).

Species

References

 

Bird genera